The Edmonton Pedway system is a network connecting office buildings, shopping centres, and parkades in downtown Edmonton, Alberta, Canada. The main network connects more than 40 buildings and parkades, and three of the five Edmonton Light Rail Transit (LRT) stations in the downtown area.

The Pedway system is integrated with public transit via climate controlled access to LRT stations.

Linked to Churchill station:
Revera The Churchill-Active Retirement Living 
Canada Place
Edmonton Convention Centre
Citadel Theatre
Stanley A. Milner Library
Westin Hotel
Royal Alberta Museum
Art Gallery of Alberta
Chancery Hall
Edmonton City Hall
Provincial Court of Alberta
John E Brownlee Building
Edmonton City Centre mall (East building)
Sandman Signature Edmonton Downtown Hotel
MNP Tower
Bell Tower
Stantec Offices/Bell Tower Parkade
Edmonton Tower
JW Marriott Edmonton Ice District & Residences
Rogers Place 
Stantec Tower

Linked to Central station:
ATB Place
Scotia Place
Commerce Place
Manulife Place
Edmonton Journal building
Edmonton City Centre mall (West building)
Royal Bank building

Linked to Bay/Enterprise Square station:
Canadian Western Bank Place
Enterprise Square

Throughout the city, there are some independent connections between buildings that are not linked to the wider system, as well as shorter tunnels leading from the surface directly to transit. Notable examples include connections to the Alberta Legislature Buildings that leads to Government Centre station, and networks connecting buildings at the University of Alberta, MacEwan University, and Northern Alberta Institute of Technology. MacEwan University and Northern Alberta Institute of Technology are entirely traversable indoors through extensive pedways and building interconnectivity.

References

External links
Map of Downtown Edmonton Pedways.

Buildings and structures in Edmonton
Pedways in Canada
Transport in Edmonton
Skyways